A Bear for Punishment is a 1951 animated Warner Bros. Looney Tunes cartoon directed by Chuck Jones. The short was released on October 20, 1951, and stars the Three Bears.

Plot
In the Three Bear's cave, Henry Bear is woken up from slumber by a ridiculous number of alarm clocks.  Junyer Bear claps and happily exclaims, "Oh boy! At last the great day has come, at last! Oh boy, oh boy!" When he can't shut them up, Junyer silences them all by whispering "Shhhhh!" Henry loses his temper, as he often does, shoving a clock in Junyer's face.  He is about to lose his temper with Ma Bear when she reminds him today is Father's Day.  Henry feels embarrassed and (reluctantly) allows his family to treat him for Father's Day.

Unfortunately, the family's celebration of Father's Day repeatedly backfires on Henry: Junyer trips on a roller skate as he is presenting Henry with breakfast in bed, covering him in food; he accidentally fills Henry's tobacco pipe with gunpowder and causes it to explode when he lights it; and he attempts to shave his "Paw" using a broken, shattered straight razor blade, leaving Henry injured to the point where Ma and Junyer briefly thinks he's dead.  However, Henry rises up and beats Junyer again, causing him to exclaim, "Paw is all right now, Maw!"

Ma and Junyer then put on an elaborate musical presentation for Father's Day, which embarrasses Henry to the extreme. This includes Junyer reciting a cheesy poem for "My Paw," Ma giving an exaggerated song-and-dance act (while keeping a dead-serious and straight face for the entire time), and Henry being grabbed and dressed up as the Statue of Liberty, while Ma and Junyer (dressed as George Washington and Abraham Lincoln respectively) present him as a tribute to Father's Day.

The march, "Father", performed by Junior and Ma, is a special vocal written to the tune of "Frat", a long-standing Warner cartoon staple. This is also one of few shorts where Mel Blanc does not provide a voice for any character.

Voice cast
Billy Bletcher as Papa Bear
Bea Benaderet as Mama Bear
Stan Freberg as Junyer Bear

Reception
Animation historian Greg Ford writes that A Bear for Punishment is "a tour de force depicting Maw and Junyer's overzealous salute to Father's Day... As outrageous as Ken Harris' animation of this pageant is, Jones' drawings of Paw, in intercut reaction shots, are even funnier... It is typical of Jones' direction that, even in the midst of one of the most energetic, floridly animated scenes in cartoon history, the primacy of the single drawing should reassert itself."

References

External links
 

1951 films
1951 comedy films
1951 animated films
1951 short films
1950s Warner Bros. animated short films
Looney Tunes shorts
Warner Bros. Cartoons animated short films
Short films directed by Chuck Jones
Films scored by Carl Stalling
Films with screenplays by Michael Maltese
Animated films about bears
Father's Day
1950s English-language films